Titania's Palace is a miniature castle (dollhouse) that was hand-built in Ireland by James Hicks & Sons, Irish Cabinet Makers, who were commissioned by Sir Nevile Wilkinson from 1907 to 1922. Wilkinson's daughter Guendolen claimed to have seen a fairy running under the roots of a tree, in a wood beside their home at Mount Merrion House. It is said that Guendolen felt sorry for the fairies, who have to live in caves. 

In the early 1930s, Wilkinson loaned the miniature to the NSPCC, who exhibited the item around the country, in an effort to raise funds. While exhibited in Croydon in the UK, Titania's Palace was visited by 4,882 people and led to over £150 (a sum equivalent to approximately £10,000 in 2017 prices) being donated to the Croydon Branch of the NSPCC.

In 1978, Titania's Palace went up on auction at Christie's but was lost to Ireland in a bidding war to Denmark where it remains on display today. 

The palace consists of 18 rooms and salons, is 4'1" tall, is built in a 12" to 1" scale (1:12)and contains hand-carved mahogany furniture. There are 3000 tiny works of art and miniatures from around the world on display inside the palace. When the palace was purchased at auction in London in 1978, the purchaser was revealed to be Legoland in Denmark. It stayed on display at Legoland until 2007. In 2006 Count Michael Ahlefeldt-Laurvig-Bille made a loan agreement with Lego to display Titania's Palace at Egeskov Castle in Denmark from 2007 onwards. It remains at Egeskov Denmark.

The underbidders at the London auction were disappointed at Titania's Palace being lost to Ireland.   They commissioned a new palace, a  dollhouse called Tara's Palace, which is on display in the Tara's Palace Museum of Childhood, located in Powerscourt Estate, near Enniskerry, County Wicklow, Ireland.

Other notable dollhouses 
Other notable dollhouses include Tara's Palace, which is on display in Ireland at the Tara's Palace Museum of Childhood in Powerscourt; the Stettheimer dollhouse in New York City, which is primarily known for its original miniature artwork; Astolat Dollhouse Castle, appraised at $8.5 million; and Colleen Moore's fairy castle, housed in Chicago's Museum of Science and Industry.

References

Legoland Website
Tara's Palace Trust and Museum of Childhood website

External links
Egeskovs Titania's Palace Website
History of Tara's Palace Trust

Decorative arts
Cultural history of Ireland
Antiques
Dollhouses